Randy Wolters (born 6 April 1990) is a Dutch professional footballer who plays as a winger for NIFL Premiership side Larne.

Career
Wolters was born in Leiden. He formerly played for FC Utrecht, FC Emmen, FC Den Bosch, VVV-Venlo and Go Ahead Eagles. He made his debut for FC Utrecht in a 1–4 home defeat against VVV-Venlo and scored the only Utrecht goal. He was the first of three Utrecht players who, in a few months time, would score in their debut match (Rafael Uiterloo and Nick de Jong were the other two).

Wolters signed a two-year contract with Scottish Premiership club Dundee in June 2017.

After 2 years at NEC Nijmegen and a short stay in Greece, on 6 January 2022 Wolters signed a six-month contract with Telstar.

In March 2023, Randy signed for Northern Ireland premiership club Larne Football Club

Career statistics

References

5.Randy Wolters joins Larne https://www.bbc.com/sport/football/64883119

External links
 Voetbal International profile 

Living people
1990 births
Footballers from Leiden
Association football midfielders
Dutch footballers
FC Utrecht players
FC Emmen players
FC Den Bosch players
VVV-Venlo players
Go Ahead Eagles players
ADO Den Haag players
Dundee F.C. players
NEC Nijmegen players
Xanthi F.C. players
SC Telstar players
Eredivisie players
Eerste Divisie players
Scottish Professional Football League players
Super League Greece 2 players
Dutch expatriate footballers
Expatriate footballers in Scotland
Dutch expatriate sportspeople in Scotland
Expatriate footballers in Greece
Dutch expatriate sportspeople in Greece